Mary Anne Arnold (born 1825) was a sailor and crossdresser. She was born in Sheerness, Kent, England and worked aboard the naval ship, Robert Small until the captain of the ship discovered she was assigned female at birth.

Early life 
At age 10, Arnold's mother died. She thus performed physical labor to provide for herself, and her eight month old sister.  Arnold first gained employment at a rope factory in Sheerness. Upon discovering that boys her age were making significantly more money as sailors, she began to crossdress and gained employment as a cabin boy in the Williams, a Sutterland collier.

Cabin boy 
Arnold sailed with the Williams for two years until 1839 (she changed ships due to her dislike of the commanding officer) at which point she became a cabin boy for the Anne. She successfully sailed with the Anne for several voyages until the ship wrecked but she survived and then transferred to sail on the ship Choice which held stores for the Robert Small.

Suspicions 
While on the Choice, around the age of 15, several of the men reported to the captain suspicions of Arnold's crossdressing. The captain ordered a doctor to perform a medical exam on Arnold. After the exam, he was forced to remove his sailor's clothes and don clothes that matched their assigned sex at birth.

References 

1825 births
People from Sheerness
Year of death unknown
Place of death unknown
Female-to-male cross-dressers